Manisha Joshi (born 1971, Kutch, Gujarat) is a Gujarati language poet and journalist. She is an author of four poetry collections including  Kandara (1996), Kansara Bazar (2001), Kandmool (2013), and Thaak (2020). She currently lives in California.

Biography 
Manisha Joshi was born on 6 April 1971 in Godhra, a small village near Mandvi in Kutch district, to Tara Joshi and Laxmikant Joshi. After finishing her HSC at Anjar in 1989, she moved to Vadodara to attend college, as there was no further education above 9th standard in her village. She completed her Bachelor of Arts and Master of Arts in English literature in 1992 and 1995 respectively at Maharaja Sayajirao University, Vadodara. She also obtained a diploma in Mass Communication from St. Xaviers College, Mumbai in 1993. While attending university she studied the books written by her college professors, including Sitanshu Yashaschandra, Ganesh Devy and Babu Suthar, and became acquainted with other Gujarati writers such as Gulam Mohammed Sheikh, Prabodh Parikh, Labhshankar Thaker, Nitin Mehta, Jaydev Shukla and Bholabhai Patel.

She worked as a print and television journalist in Mumbai and in London. After marriage she settled in the United States. Presently she lives in Berkeley, California.

Works 
Manisha began writing poetry aged 18, after her HSC examinations. During her college years she read world literature, in particular modern literature. Subsequently her poems were published in several English and Gujarati language magazines including The Wolf, Indian Literature, New Quest, Shabdasrishti, Parab, Navneet Samarpan, Kavita, Tathapi, Sahacharya Varshiki, Etad, Samipe, Vahi and Sandhi.

Kandara (The Cave), her first collection of poems, was published in 1996 by Gujarati Sahitya Parishad with a preface by Chandrakant Topiwala. It was critically acclaimed by several Gujarati authors including Sitanshu Yashaschandra, Prabodh Parikh and Chinu Modi. Her second collection of poems Kansara Bazar (The Pots-and-Pans Bazaar) was published in 2001, followed by Kandmool in 2013. Some of her poems have been translated into English and Hindi. Her poetry is characterized by suggestive and surreal imagery. She published her fourth collection, Thaak (Fatigue), in 2020.

Awards 
Her poetry collection Kandmool received Gujarat Sahitya Akademi's 2013 first prize. She was nominated for the Sanskriti Award by Sanskriti Pratishthan in 1998 for her contribution to modern Gujarati poetry.

See also
 List of Gujarati-language writers

References

External links
 

1971 births
Living people
Gujarati-language writers
People from Mandvi
Indian women journalists
Women writers from Gujarat
American women writers of Indian descent
21st-century Indian women writers
21st-century Indian writers
Indian emigrants to the United States
St. Xavier's College, Mumbai alumni
Maharaja Sayajirao University of Baroda alumni
Indian surrealist writers
21st-century American women